Derbyshire Wildlife Trust is one of 46 local Wildlife Trusts around the UK working to promote and protect local wildlife. It covers the whole of Derbyshire and was founded in 1962 in response to environmental threats to the local countryside, since when it has continued to grow. The Trust is now based at East Mill on the River Derwent in the town of Belper, Derbyshire. It is a Registered Charity (Number 222212), supported by more than 14,000 members and over 500 volunteers.

The Trust manages 43 nature reserves covering  throughout the county, from flooded gravel pits in the south to moorland and upland woodland in the north. Fourteen of these are Sites of Special Scientific Interest (SSSIs). The Trust also works with schools, local communities, local authorities, landowners and others to promote and protect the natural environment. Environmental education and workshops are provided at the Avenue Washlands Visitor Centre, the Whistlestop Centre, and the Wildlife Discovery Room at Carsington Water.

Derbyshire Wildlife Trust has a 'Living Landscape' approach to nature conservation. By working with local businesses, landowners, communities and individuals on habitat restoration and enhancement projects throughout the county, it is hoped landscape scale conservation will create a healthier environment for wildlife, the local economy and people.

History 
The Trust originated in 1962 as Derbyshire Naturalists' Trust.
In the early 1960s a group of concerned people gathered together to oppose plans to tip fly ash at Ticknall Limeyards in South Derbyshire. Backed by national pressure, they were successful and decided to form a local charitable organisation to handle such issues. Derbyshire Naturalists' Trust was officially launched.

By 1967, the Trust had established two nature reserves, one of them at Ticknall Limeyards itself. The other, a Site of Special Scientific Interest (SSSI) at Morley Brickyards, was leased to the Trust by its owner and is still being managed as a nature reserve. The Trust also acquired Overdale, the first nature reserve that it owned outright. The  of upland pasture were donated by Portland Cement to mark European Conservation Year. A bequest allowed the Trust to appoint its first member of staff in 1973.

As the Trust grew it was able to campaign more effectively and in 1984 hit the national headlines when it won a private prosecution against five men caught badger digging.
After rebranding to become Derbyshire Wildlife Trust in 1986, the organisation became the focus of attention again the following year when it launched an appeal to raise £200,000 to renovate the old railway station buildings at Matlock Bath and create the Whistlestop Countryside Centre, an education facility in the old railway station buildings at Matlock Bath. Later in the decade a major Heritage Lottery Fund award enabled the Trust to develop more nature reserves work and set up a Midweek Volunteer Team.

In 2007 the Avenue Washlands Nature Reserve near Chesterfield was opened and won first place in the Conservation category for Restoration Sites in the British Trust for Ornithology's Business Bird Challenge. In the same year, a Lottery grant allowed the trust to extend its educational programme with Grounds for a Change, transforming Derbyshire school grounds into wildlife havens and outdoor learning spaces. It also took over management of Drakelow Nature Reserve in the south of the county, an important wetland site playing host to over 200 species of birds. 

In recent years the Trust has launched and developed a variety of projects aimed at protecting and raising awareness of vulnerable species and habitats. More recent projects have included Derby Cathedral's Peregrines Project, Great Trees of Derbyshire and Saving the Great Trees of Derbyshire, projects which have raised awareness of the importance of ancient trees, and Water for Wildlife which has helped to restore wetland habitats.

Organisation 
Derbyshire Wildlife Trust is governed by a Board of Trustees, elected from and by the 14,000+ members.
The Trust employs around 26 members of experienced staff to run the Trust and carry out conservation and education projects. 
Volunteers are essential to the work of the Trust. They help with many aspects including nature reserves, administration and education work. The Trust currently has around 500 volunteers.

List of nature reserves 

The Avenue Washlands
Barton Pool
Broadhurst Edge Wood
Brockholes Wood SSSI
Carr Vale
Carvers Rocks SSSI
Chee Dale SSSI
Cramside Wood SSSI
Cromford Canal LNR/SSSI
Deep Dale and Topley Pike SSSI
Derwentside
Drakelow
Duckmanton Railway Cutting SSSI
Erewash Meadows
Gang Mine
Golden Brook Storage Lagoon
Hadfields Quarry
Hartington Meadows
Hillbridge and Park Woods
Hilton Gravel Pits SSSI
Hoe Grange Quarry
Hollinhill and Markland Grips
Holly Wood
Hopton Quarry SSSI
Ladybower Wood SSSI
Lea Wood
Lock Lane Ash Tip
Long Clough
Mapperley Wood
Miller's Dale Quarry SSSI
Morley Brickyards SSSI
North Wingfield
Oakerthorpe LNR
Overdale
Priestcliffe Lees SSSI
Risley Glebe
Rose End Meadows
Rowsley Sidings
Spring Wood SSSI
Watford Lodge LNR
Willington Gravel Pits
Woodside
Wyver Lane

References

External links
 The Derbyshire Wildlife Trust web page

Wildlife Trusts of England
Organisations based in Derbyshire
1962 establishments in England
Nature reserves in Derbyshire